Marco Franin (born 1 February 1992) is a Swiss/Croatian footballer currently playing for FC Gossau in the fourth tier-Swiss 1. Liga.

Club career
Franin has played for Swiss top flight side St. Gallen, moved to second level-Chiasso in 2014 and joined Promotion League outfit Brühl from them in summer 2016.

References

External links
 
 Profile - SC Brühl
 Profile - FC Sankt Gallen

1992 births
Living people
People from Appenzell Ausserrhoden
Association football defenders
Swiss men's footballers
FC St. Gallen players
FC Chiasso players
SC Brühl players
FC Gossau players
Swiss Super League players
Swiss Challenge League players
Swiss Promotion League players
Swiss 1. Liga (football) players